Oren Ethelbirt Long (March 4, 1889 – May 6, 1965) was an American politician who served as the tenth Territorial Governor of Hawaii from 1951 to 1953. A member of the Democratic Party of Hawaii, Long was appointed to the office after the term of Ingram Stainback. After statehood was achieved he served in the United States Senate, one of the first two, along with Hiram Fong, to represent Hawaii in that body. Long was the only non-Asian American U.S. Senator from Hawaii until the appointment of Brian Schatz to the position in 2012.

Life and career
Long was born in Altoona, Kansas and attended Johnson Bible College in Knoxville, Tennessee, the University of Michigan, and Columbia University in New York City. He first came to Hawaii in 1917 as a social worker in Hilo. He then held various educational positions in the public school system, eventually serving as a superintendent from 1933 to 1946. He was appointed Governor of the Territory of Hawaii by President of the United States Harry Truman in 1951 and served until 1953. Long served in the Hawaii Territorial Senate from 1956-1959.

On July 28, 1959 he was elected to one of the two Senate seats from the newly formed State of Hawaii, and took office on August 21, 1959. The other Senator elected was Republican Hiram Fong. Long chose not to run for a full six-year term in 1962, and was succeeded by fellow Democrat and then-Rep. Daniel Inouye, in January 1963.

For his entire tenure Long was Hawaii's Senior Senator, as he took office the same day with fellow Senator from new state, Hiram Fong (with Long having a seniority edge due to being former Governor)

Long appeared as a contestant on What's My Line? shortly after taking office.  One of the panellists Bennett Cerf recognised him immediately and disqualified himself from the round.  After three rounds of questioning, the rest of the panel successfully guessed him to be the senator from Hawaii.

He died in 1965 after suffering an attack of asthmatic bronchitis  in Honolulu, Hawaii and was buried in Oahu Cemetery.

Long's papers are stored at the University of Hawaiʻi at Mānoa in their Catalog for Archival Materials.

References

External links

 

|-

|-

1889 births
1965 deaths
20th-century American politicians
American Disciples of Christ
Burials at Oahu Cemetery
Columbia College (New York) alumni
Democratic Party United States senators from Hawaii
Governors of the Territory of Hawaii
Hawaii Democrats
Johnson University alumni
People from Altoona, Kansas
University of Michigan alumni